The 1st Assembly District of Wisconsin is one of 99 districts in the Wisconsin State Assembly. Located in northeastern Wisconsin, the district comprises all of Door and Kewaunee counties, as well as portions of northeast Brown County. The district is represented by Republican Joel Kitchens, since January 2015.

The 1st Assembly district is located within Wisconsin's 1st Senate district, along with the 2nd and 3rd Assembly districts.

History
The district was created in the 1972 redistricting act (1971 Wisc. Act 304) which first established the numbered district system, replacing the previous system which allocated districts to specific counties.  The 1st district was drawn roughly in line with the boundaries of the previous Door–Kewaunee district, and the last representative of that district, Lary J. Swoboda, continued as the representative of the 1st district after the 1972 election.  The 1st district boundaries have remained relatively consistent in redistricting since 1972, with the major exception of the 1982 court-ordered redistricting, which scrambled all State Assembly districts and moved the 1st district to Milwaukee County for the 1983–1984 legislative session.

List of past representatives

Electoral history

References 

Wisconsin State Assembly districts
Door County, Wisconsin
Kewaunee County, Wisconsin
Brown County, Wisconsin
Manitowoc County, Wisconsin